Melanie Symons (born 1975) is an Australian media personality, who is best known for appearing on a number of television shows on the Seven Network, most notably Saturday Disney from 1997 until 2002, and Ground Force from 2002 until 2005.

Symons began her career on Network Ten's Totally Wild in 1994 as a reporter. In 1997 she moved to the Seven Network's children's television show Saturday Disney, where she hosted for five years. In April 2002 she began presenting on the Australian version of the backyard renovation show Ground Force as the "bargain hunter". In 2003 Symons also presented her own lifestyle program Australia's Best Backyards, and co-hosted Wheel of Fortune as a fill-in for two weeks.

She hosted the first fashion segments on the Sunrise breakfast program and also appears on The Morning Show. For over ten years she has been presenter for Sydney Weekender, a local travel program that shows viewers the best places to go and things to do across New South Wales.

Television roles

Personal life
In 2016, at 40 years of age, Symons had a child with her partner Scott Craft, the younger brother of fellow Saturday Disney presenter Shelley Craft.

References

External links
 

Australian television personalities
Women television personalities
Australian people of Greek descent
Living people
1975 births